Pearls is the sixth compilation by the German heavy metal band Bonfire. It is a greatest hits collection that was released by UDR in 2016, featuring a double CD set of several of the band’s most popular songs. The songs have all been re-recorded with the band line-up of the time and featured new versions and rewritten lyrics to some. This album was a means to celebrate the band’s 30th anniversary..

Track listing

CD 1

CD 2

Band members
David Reece – lead vocals
Hans Ziller – guitars
Frank Pane – guitars
Ronnie Parkes – bass
Tim Breideband – drums

References

External links
Melodic Rock review

Bonfire (band) compilation albums
2016 compilation albums